Scaphella junonia, common names the junonia, or Juno's volute,  is a species of large sea snail, a marine gastropod mollusk in the family Volutidae, the volutes.

This species lives in water from 29 m to 126 m depth in the tropical Western Atlantic. Because of its deepwater habitat, the shell usually only washes up onto beaches after strong storms, or hurricanes.

The species is named after the ancient Roman goddess Juno.

Distribution
Scaphella junonia is found throughout Florida to Texas and the Gulf of Mexico.

 A subspecies, Scaphella junonia johnstoneae, is found off of Alabama and is the state shell of that state.
 Another subspecies, Scaphella junonia butleri, is found off of the Yucatan.

Shell description
The largest recorded shell of Scaphella junonia is 154 mm in length. The shell is cream in color with about 12 spiral rows of somewhat squarish brown dots. The large protoconch is tan. The aperture of the shell is almost 3/4 of the length of the shell.

Human relevance

The shell was historically greatly prized for its beauty and apparent rarity. It is however commonly taken (accidentally as bycatch) from deeper water during commercial trawling by shrimp fishermen in the Gulf of Mexico. This source provides plenty of specimens for the shell trade, and so the price of a specimen shell is relatively low. However, the shell is still very hard to find naturally cast up on beaches, so people who find a junonia while shelling on Sanibel Island, Florida, often get their picture in the local newspapers.

References
Citations

Bibliography
 Conchologists of America, Peter Dance article on this species
 Rosenberg, G. 1992. Encyclopedia of Seashells. Dorset: New York. 224 pp. page(s): 99
 Bail, P & Poppe, G. T. 2001. A conchological iconography: a taxonomic introduction of the recent Volutidae. Hackenheim-Conchbook, 30 pp, 5 pl.
 Rosenberg, G., F. Moretzsohn, and E. F. García. 2009. Gastropoda (Mollusca) of the Gulf of Mexico, Pp. 579–699 in Felder, D.L. and D.K. Camp (eds.), Gulf of Mexico–Origins, Waters, and Biota. Biodiversity. Texas A&M Press, College Station, Texas.

Further reading 
 

Volutidae
Gastropods described in 1804
Symbols of Alabama